Esteban Andrés Solari Poggio (born 2 June 1980) is an Argentine former professional footballer who played as a striker, currently manager of Malaysia Super League club Johor Darul Ta'zim.

Playing career
Solari was born in Rosario, Santa Fe. After emerging through Club Atlético Vélez Sarsfield's youth ranks, he made his professional debut with Estudiantes de La Plata. He also represented in his country Defensa y Justicia, Argentinos Juniors and Gimnasia y Esgrima de Jujuy.

After one year in Italy with amateurs A.C. Chioggia Sottomarina, Solari joined Lierse S.K. in the Belgian Pro League in the 2004 summer, scoring five goals in his only season to help his team finish in tenth position. Subsequently, he signed for APOEL FC in Cyprus, extending his contract until 2008 after impressing in his first year – 14 league goals in only 16 starts, Cypriot Cup conquest.

Solari finished top scorer in the First Division in 2006–07 (20 goals), as the Nicosia-based club won its third national championship in six years. He was also voted the league's MVP but, at the end of May 2007, agreed on a transfer to Club Universidad Nacional of Mexico, once again winning an individual scoring accolade after netting 14 times in the Apertura.

On 15 June 2008, Solari was transferred to UD Almería, who paid €3.8 million to UNAM. He made his Spanish La Liga debut on 31 August, in a 3–1 away win against Athletic Bilbao where he came on as a late substitute. He finished his first season with just eight games, scoring his only league goal – three overall – for the Andalusians in the 2–1 loss at CD Numancia.

On 2 June 2010, the 30-year-old Solari signed for three years with former club APOEL. He immediately made an impact by scoring four goals in six appearances in that season's UEFA Europa League, going on to add 11 in 28 in the domestic league, which again ended in conquest.

All rounds included, Solari took part in 12 games in his team's 2011–12 UEFA Champions League campaign. On 4 April 2012, he scored from a penalty kick in a 5–2 quarter-final defeat against Real Madrid at the Santiago Bernabéu (8–2 on aggregate).

Solari was hit by several injuries in 2012–13 and, as a result, appeared in only three matches in all competitions. On 5 January 2013 his contract with APOEL was terminated by mutual consent, and he joined Apollon Limassol FC of the same league later the same month.

On 16 July 2013, Solari moved teams and countries again, penning a deal at Super League Greece club Skoda Xanthi FC. One year later, having been crowned the competition's top scorer, he signed for Dalian Aerbin F.C. from the Chinese Super League.

Solari returned to Greece and its top flight on 6 February 2015, signing a six-month contract with Ergotelis FC. He subsequently competed in the Ecuadorian Serie A, with C.D. Cuenca and S.D. Aucas.

Coaching career
In late 2018, Solari was named Fernando Batista's assistant at the Argentina under-20 team. The pair worked together at the 2019 FIFA World Cup in Poland and later with the under-23 side at the 2020 Summer Olympics, with the latter competition being delayed due to the COVID-19 pandemic.

Solari was appointed head coach of Johor Darul Ta'zim F.C. on 1 December 2022, replacing his compatriot Héctor Bidoglio who stepped down to become technical director of the Malaysia Super League club.

Personal life
Solari was nicknamed "Tano", which means "Italian" in Argentinian slang. His father Eduardo and two of his four siblings, the elder Santiago and younger David, were also footballers, with the former playing with individual and team success for Real Madrid and Inter Milan; his uncle Jorge represented several clubs during his career, mostly Club Atlético River Plate, whilst cousin through marriage Fernando Redondo also appeared for Real Madrid.

Solari's sister, Liz, worked as an actress.

Honours
APOEL
Cypriot First Division: 2006–07, 2010–11
Cypriot Cup: 2005–06
Cypriot Super Cup: 2011

Apollon Limassol
Cypriot Cup: 2012–13

Individual
Cypriot First Division MVP: 2006–07
Cypriot First Division top scorer: 2006–07
Super League Greece top scorer: 2013–14

References

External links

1980 births
Living people
Argentine footballers
Footballers from Rosario, Santa Fe
Association football forwards
Argentine Primera División players
Estudiantes de La Plata footballers
Defensa y Justicia footballers
Argentinos Juniors footballers
Gimnasia y Esgrima de Jujuy footballers
Belgian Pro League players
Lierse S.K. players
Cypriot First Division players
APOEL FC players
Apollon Limassol FC players
Liga MX players
Club Universidad Nacional footballers
La Liga players
UD Almería players
Super League Greece players
Xanthi F.C. players
Ergotelis F.C. players
Chinese Super League players
Dalian Professional F.C. players
Ecuadorian Serie A players
C.D. Cuenca footballers
S.D. Aucas footballers
Argentine expatriate footballers
Expatriate footballers in Italy
Expatriate footballers in Belgium
Expatriate footballers in Cyprus
Expatriate footballers in Mexico
Expatriate footballers in Spain
Expatriate footballers in Greece
Expatriate footballers in China
Expatriate footballers in Ecuador
Argentine expatriate sportspeople in Italy
Argentine expatriate sportspeople in Belgium
Argentine expatriate sportspeople in Cyprus
Argentine expatriate sportspeople in Mexico
Argentine expatriate sportspeople in Spain
Argentine expatriate sportspeople in Greece
Argentine expatriate sportspeople in China
Argentine expatriate sportspeople in Ecuador
Argentine football managers
Malaysia Super League managers
Argentine expatriate football managers
Expatriate football managers in Malaysia
Argentine expatriate sportspeople in Malaysia